"When I Die" is a song originally released by the Real Milli Vanilli on their 1991 album The Moment of Truth, and later by Try 'N' B on their 1992 debut album. The song achieved more exposure when German Eurodance group No Mercy covered it for their 1996 debut album, My Promise. Their version was released as the third single from the album in November 1996 and reached number one in Austria and the Netherlands, number two in Australia, number three in Switzerland, and number five in Germany and Spain.

Critical reception
Larry Flick from Billboard wrote, "With this lovely and instantly memorable pop ballad, Arista aims to cement the future of this charming male vocal trio as more than merely a flash in the disco pan. It's a realistic goal, given the strength of their performance here—it's warmly soulful and technically far more flexible than what the act has displayed on its previous dance hits. In a sea of jeep-styled sound-alike slow jams, this Latin-flavored gem should stand out quite nicely with its plush keyboards and delicate acoustic guitar lines. Not to be missed." The magazine's Paul Verna described it as a "brooding ballad", "which allows singer Marty Cintron to fully flex his boyish, star-powered charm." Dave Sholin from the Gavin Report commented, "Proving they're also adept when it comes to tackling a ballad, this Miami trio slows it down and blends some sweet harmony into a pretty melody." Diana Valois from The Morning Call felt it has Marty Cintron "sounding like a coy and eager Prince".

Track listings
 CD single
 "When I Die" (radio) – 4:28	
 "For Eternity" (Manumission club mix) – 5:56

 European CD maxi
 "When I Die" (radio edit) – 4:28	
 "When I Die" (extended) – 6:16	
 "For Eternity" (Manumission club mix) – 5:56	
 "When I Die" (unplugged) – 4:12	
 "Message of Love" – 3:08

Charts

Weekly charts

Year-end charts

Certifications

Release history

References

1991 songs
1996 singles
1997 singles
Arista Records singles
Bertelsmann Music Group singles
Dutch Top 40 number-one singles
English-language German songs
No Mercy (pop band) songs
Number-one singles in Austria
Song recordings produced by Frank Farian
Songs written by Diane Warren
Songs written by Frank Farian